Liliidae is a botanical name at the rank of subclass. Circumscription of the subclass will vary with the taxonomic system being used (there are many such systems); the only requirement being that it includes the family Liliaceae.

Liliidae in Takhtajan system
The Takhtajan system treats this as one of six subclasses within class Liliopsida (= monocotyledons). This subclass consists of:
 subclass Liliidae
 superorder Lilianae
 order Melanthiales
 order Colchicales
 order Trilliales
 order Liliales
 order Alstroemeriales
 order Iridales
 order Tecophilaeales
 order Burmanniales
 order Hypoxidales
 order Orchidales
 order Amaryllidales
 order Asparagales
 order Xanthorrhoeales
 order Hanguanales
 superorder Dioscoreanae
 order Stemonales
 order Smilacales
 order Dioscoreales
 order Taccales

Liliidae in Cronquist system
The Cronquist system treats this as one of five subclasses within class Liliopsida (= monocotyledons), and it consists of:
 
 subclass Liliidae
 order Liliales
 order Orchidales

Liliidae in Dahlgren and Thorne systems
In the Dahlgren system and the Thorne system (1992) this is an important name: this subclass comprises the monocotyledons (in APG II these are the monocots).

Dahlgren (1985) 
 subclass Liliidae [= monocotyledons]
 superorder Alismatanae
 superorder Triuridanae
 superorder Aranae
 superorder Lilianae
 superorder Bromelianae
 superorder Zingiberanae
 superorder Commelinanae
 superorder Arecanae
 superorder Cyclanthanae
 superorder Pandananae

Thorne (1992)
(in the version of the system as depicted by Reveal)
 subclass Liliidae [= monocotyledons ]
 superorder Lilianae
 superorder Hydatellanae
 superorder Triuridanae
 superorder Aranae
 superorder Cyclanthanae
 superorder Pandananae
 superorder Arecanae
 superorder Commelinanae

Liliidae in APG II system
The APG and APG II systems do not use formal botanical names above the rank of order, and names such as Liliopsida and Liliidae have no place in these systems.

References 

Monocots
Historically recognized angiosperm taxa